Amblyseius duplicesetus is a species of mite in the family Phytoseiidae.

References

duplicesetus
Articles created by Qbugbot
Animals described in 1988